In enzymology, a nitrite reductase (NO-forming) is an enzyme that catalyzes the chemical reaction
nitric oxide + H2O + ferricytochrome c ⇌ nitrite + ferrocytochrome c + 2 H+

The 3 substrates of this enzyme are nitric oxide, H2O, and ferricytochrome c, whereas its 3 products are nitrite, ferrocytochrome c, and H+.

This enzyme belongs to the family of oxidoreductases, specifically those acting on other nitrogenous compounds as donors with a cytochrome as acceptor.  The systematic name of this enzyme class is nitric-oxide:ferricytochrome-c oxidoreductase. Other names in common use include cd-cytochrome nitrite reductase, [nitrite reductase (cytochrome)] [misleading, see comments.], cytochrome c-551:O2, NO2+ oxidoreductase, cytochrome cd, cytochrome cd1, hydroxylamine (acceptor) reductase, methyl viologen-nitrite reductase, nitrite reductase (cytochrome, and NO-forming).  This enzyme participates in nitrogen metabolism.  It has 3 cofactors: FAD, Iron,  and Copper.

Structural studies

References

 
 
 
 
 
 
 
 
 
 
 

EC 1.7.2
Flavoproteins
Iron enzymes
Copper enzymes
Enzymes of known structure